Keycloak is an open source software product to allow single sign-on with Identity and Access Management aimed at modern applications and services.   this WildFly community project is under the stewardship of Red Hat who use it as the upstream project for their RH-SSO product.

History
The first production release of Keycloak was in September 2014, with development having started about a year earlier.  In 2016 Red Hat switched the RH SSO product from being based on the PicketLink framework to being based on the Keycloak upstream Project.  This followed a merging of the PicketLink codebase into Keycloak.
 
To some extent Keycloak can now also be considered a replacement of the Red Hat JBoss SSO open source product which was previously superseded by PicketLink.   JBoss.org is redirecting the old jbosssso subsite to the Keycloak website.  The JBoss name is a registered trademark and Red Hat moved its upstream open source projects names to avoid using JBoss, JBoss AS to Wildfly being a more commonly recognized example.

Features
The features of Keycloak include:
 User registration
 Social login
 Single sign-on/sign-off across all applications belonging to the same realm
 Two-factor authentication
 LDAP integration
 Kerberos broker
 Multitenancy with per-realm customizable skin
 Custom extensions to extend the core functionality

Components
There are two main components of Keycloak:
 Keycloak server, including the API and graphical interface.
 Keycloak application adapter: a set of libraries to call the server.

See also
 Single sign-on (SSO)
 OpenAM
 Kerberos (protocol)
 Identity management
 List of single sign-on implementations
 Red Hat Single Sign-On

References

External links
 Official website
 
 Free Keycloak tutorials
 

Computer security software
Java enterprise platform
Federated identity
Java (programming language) software